Vince Martin (born July 3, 1955) is a Dutch-Australian actor, editor, director, jazz singer, and musician. Born in the Netherlands, he was raised in Australia where he started his career.

Early life
Martin was born as Vincent Markesteijn in the Netherlands about 1955, and raised in Australia from the age of 7.

Career
Martin began as a film editor on police drama series Homicide. His editing career had begun at the age of 16 at Crawford Productions.  He quickly moved on to directing television series for the same company.

Starting in the 1970s he became a regular face on Australian television, with both guest starring television series roles, and regular roles in several soap operas as well as films with Gerard Kennedy, Judy Morris, Nicole Kidman and Carmen Duncan amongst others. He played two different characters (who were neither related nor lookalikes), in teen soap Class of '74, then completed stints in soaps Number 96 (as David Palmer), The Restless Years (as Craig Garside), The Young Doctors (as Dr. Richard Quinlan), Sons and Daughters (as Matt Kennedy), E Street (as Steven Richardson, better known as "Mr Bad") and Home and Away (as Phil Bryant). He acted in the film Keiron: The First Voyager.  Guest appearances in drama series include Chopper Squad and Mission: Impossible.

As well as playing the role of Matt Kennedy in the soap opera, Sons and Daughters, he also worked as a regular director on this series. In 2000, Martin acted alongside Tom Hanks in Cast Away, as Pilot Al Miller.

His over 30-year campaign for Beaurepaires New Zealand has won international advertising awards and places him as one of the most recognised performers in New Zealand. He has a large fan base in New Zealand and is the longest serving retail brand spokesperson in New Zealand television history.

He played Wayne in the 2012 New Zealand family film Kiwi Flyer.

Personal life 
Martin has a daughter, Emma. After working in Los Angeles, Vince now works in New York City and New Jersey as a jazz singer/musician.  After 10 years together, Martin married Jenifer Swenson on 29 April 2014.

References

External links

 

Dutch emigrants to Australia
Dutch male film actors
Dutch male television actors
Dutch male voice actors
Dutch male video game actors
Australian male film actors
Australian male television actors
Australian male voice actors
Australian male video game actors
Living people
1955 births
Australian expatriate male actors in the United States